In Amethyst Color (poor-translated as the In Purple Color and The Color Purple) is a 2005 Iranian film directed by Ebrahim Hatamikia and starring Hamid Farokhnezhad and Farhad Ghaemian.

The film was banned from screening for some years by the order of the Ministry of Intelligence because the film depicts the image of a security official.

References

External links 
 
 

Films directed by Ebrahim Hatamikia
Iranian drama films
2005 drama films
2000s Persian-language films
Films whose director won the Best Directing Crystal Simorgh
Crystal Simorgh for Best Film winners
Crystal Simorgh for Audience Choice of Best Film winners